Ulla Bohmgren (born 3 October 1953), is a Swedish chess player, Women's Chess Olympiad individual silver medalist (1972).

Biography
In the first half of 1970s Ulla Bohmgren was one of Sweden's leading chess players. In 1971, she won Swedish Junior Chess Championship.

Ulla Bohmgren played for Sweden in the Women's Chess Olympiads:
 In 1972, at first reserve board in the 5th Chess Olympiad (women) in Skopje (+4, =1, -3) and won individual silver medal,
 In 1976, at first reserve board in the 7th Chess Olympiad (women) in Haifa (+3, =1, -4).

Since 1990 she has rarely participated in chess tournaments.

References

External links

Ulla Bohmgren chess games at 365Chess.com

1953 births
Living people
Swedish female chess players
Chess Olympiad competitors